The backdraft is a cocktail that is noted for its elaborate preparation and potency. Named after the backdraft which occurs in some fire situations, this drink produces a similar condition on purpose using flammable alcoholic drinks and an enclosing container, such as an upside down pint glass. Below is a typical procedure for producing one variation of the backdraft drink. The combination of warm alcohol, followed by inhaling vaporized alcohol, and then finishing with a highly spiced warm alcohol, makes the drinking of this drink difficult, and while it tends not to have an immediate effect (since it is drunk quickly), the warmth of the alcohol and the vapor, make the concentration and absorption of alcohol into the bloodstream quicker than other drinks, and produces a more profound impact.

The procedure listed below is a typical illustration of how the drink is presented, and the steps used to produce the backdraft effect. The alcohols listed can be substituted with others, as there are various recipes. However, the steps of this procedure are required to be taken in this order to produce what is known as a classic backdraft drink.

Classical backdraft preparation
A classic backdraft is prepared by pouring equal amounts of Drambuie and Grand Marnier into a snifter.  The mixture is set alight, and after a few seconds, extinguished by having the imbiber seal the top of the glass with their hand, although often a coaster or saucer is used instead.  Once the flame is out, a straw is inserted, keeping as much of the seal intact as possible to contain the vapors.

Both the liquid and the vapors are then consumed through the straw.

Drambuie and Grand Marnier will be extremely difficult to ignite, if not impossible, so backdrafts are commonly done with 1 part Grand Marnier and 1 part 151.

Alternate "shooter" backdraft preparation
The procedure is as follows:

A saucer is placed on a counter or table.
A shot glass is placed in the center of the saucer, filled with Sambuca
A pint glass is filled with 1–2 shots of Cointreau. Swirl this in the glass to coat the sides
The Cointreau is lit and allowed to burn until the sides of the glass become warm to the touch
The lit Cointreau is poured into the shot glass, igniting the Sambuca
Cinnamon (or black pepper in the case of a pepperdraft) is sprinkled into the flaming alcohol from about 1/3 of a meter (1 foot) above the shot glass.  The finely powdered spice will ignite in the flame. Important: All the while the pint glass must be kept upside down above the flames to catch the alcohol vapor coming off the burning liquids.
When approximately 3-6 good shakes of cinnamon have been dispensed, the pint glass is lowered over the flaming liquid. Note:  the liquid on the outside of the inverted pint glass will still burn and needs to be gently blown out. The upside down pint glass is smaller than the coffee cup saucer, and will thus seal to the saucer extinguishing the flames inside
As the alcohol cools inside the pint glass it will try to suck the alcohol on the outside back into the upside down pint glass. This backdraft effect is the origin of the drink's name.
The pint glass is removed and 2–3 ice cubes are placed into it.  The opening of the pint glass is immediately sealed with the palm of the bartender's hand.
The pint glass is shaken: this has the effect of cooling the alcohol vapors and causing them to condense on the ice cubes, the walls of the glass and the air inside the glass.
Preparation is now complete.  The drinker first downs the shot or drinks it through a straw.  Then the straw is slipped through the bartender's fingers into the pint glass, whereby the drinker "drinks" the condensed alcohol - actually mainly inhaling the alcohol vapors inside the glass.  Finally, the drinker uses the straw to suck up the spirits which have collected in the saucer.  The combination of ingested and inhaled alcohol makes this drink extremely potent.  The ice cubes (and the layer of condensed alcohol on them) may be eaten if desired.

Backdraft physics
When a gas is heated, its volume increases. It will displace cooler gases as it expands. If this is done in a partially enclosed space, and the vessel allowed to be full of hot gas, when the heat is taken away, the gases cool and as they do, the amount of liquids that the gas can hold will decrease. Therefore, most of the moisture and alcohol held in the gas will condense. As the gas cools, it decreases in volume, and the pressure drops. Thus when the flaming alcohol in a backdraft is covered with a pint glass over a saucer, the dense, cold air is replaced with less dense, warm air with a lot of alcohol vapour held in it. As the oxygen flow to the fire is restricted, the remaining oxygen is used up and the fire in the pint glass goes out, removing the heat source. The alcohol-laden warm air now in the glass cools and begins to create a pressure difference. The air outside the pint glass forces its way into the partially evacuated pint glass and is responsible for pushing any liquid at the outside bottom of the pint glass further inside (as the seal of the glass and the saucer is not perfect) as it begins to equalise the pressure difference. Once the majority of the liquid is inside the upside down pint glass, sometimes further air can be seen to bubble up into the glass. At some point an equilibrium will occur, where the pressure difference between inside and outside of the glass is equal to the pressure of the column of liquid held up inside, and this will hold the liquid inside the glass. Sometimes, when a good seal is made, the pressure difference between the inside and the outside of the glass exerts a great enough force that when the glass is lifted, the saucer will remain stuck to its underside.

When the pint glass is removed, ice is immediately added, thus causing the condensation of the alcohol vapour, creating a white mist in the glass by a process fairly similar to the formation of contrails. By covering the glass with the hand, this vapour is trapped until it is extracted by the process of inhalation, usually through a straw.

References

External links
Backdraft video from Youtube

Cocktails with liqueur
Flaming drinks
Shooters (drinks)